'K.C. Das Commerce College was established in 1983 and is a Provincialised College under the Government of Assam.

Academics
K. C. Das Commerce College houses the following departments:
 Higher Secondary (1+1)
 Bachelor of Commerce (B.Com.)
 Bachelor of Arts (Economics Honours)
 Bachelor of Science (Economics-Statistics-Mathematics combination Regular Course)
 Master of Commerce (M.Com.)
 Bachelor of Business Administration (BBA)
 Bachelor of Computer Application (BCA)
 Post Graduate Diploma in Computer Application
 Value Added Education

References

External links
http://www.kcdccollege.ac.in

Universities and colleges in Guwahati
Colleges affiliated to Gauhati University
Educational institutions established in 1983
1983 establishments in Assam